The Venetian Ghetto was the area of Venice in which Jews were forced to live by the government of the Venetian Republic. The English word ghetto is derived from the Jewish ghetto in Venice. The Venetian Ghetto was instituted on 29 March 1516 by decree of Doge Leonardo Loredan and the Venetian Senate. It was not the first time that Jews in Venice were compelled to live in a segregated area of the city. In 1555, Venice had 160,208 inhabitants, including 923 Jews, who were mainly merchants.

In 1797 the French Army of Italy, commanded by the 28-year-old General Napoleon Bonaparte, occupied Venice, forced the Venetian Republic to dissolve itself on 12 May 1797, and ended the ghetto's separation from the city on 11 July the same year. In the 19th century, the ghetto was renamed the Contrada dell'unione.

Etymology

The origins of the name ghetto (ghèto in the Venetian language) are disputed. Among the theories are:
ghetto comes from "giotto" or "geto", meaning "foundry", since the first Jewish quarter was near a foundry that once made cannons; ghetto, from Italian getto, which is the act of, or the resulting object from, pouring molted metal into a mold, as old state foundries existed in this city quarter 
ghetto formerly meant "street" (like German Gasse, Swedish gata, and Gothic gatwo)
ghetto comes from borghetto, diminutive of borgo, meaning "little town"
ghetto is related to the Hebrew word get, meaning a divorce document.

The Oxford University Press etymologist Anatoly Liberman 2009 reviewed many theories and concluded that all were speculative.

Donatella Calabi, faculty member of IUAV University Venice, Architecture, Construction and Conservation, argued in the documentary Venice and the Ghetto (2017, Klaus T. Steindl) that ghetto comes from the Italian word gettare [dʒet·ˈta:·re] which means "throw away", because the area was before then a waste dump for foundries. The first Jewish arrivals were German and they pronounced the word [ˈɡɛto] - the spelling followed ("h" after "g" changes [dʒ] to [ˈɡ]). The same opinion was published in her book Venezia e il ghetto. Cinquecento anni del "recinto deli ebrei". Marcella Ansaldi, director of the Jewish Museum of Venice, endorses this theory in a history video.  

The author of Ghetto: The History of a Word, Daniel B. Schwartz, endorses the theories that the term ghetto did not emerge as a result of Jewish resident segregation, but rather, that the word is a relic of a history that preceded the arrival of the Jewish residents. Schwartz states that the strongest argument in support of this is how the original area to which Jews were restricted was called the Ghetto Nuovo, and not the Ghetto Vecchio. "Were it otherwise, one would expect that the first site of the Jewish enclosure would have been known as the 'Old Ghetto' and the subsequent addition as the 'New Ghetto.'"

Location and geography

The Ghetto is an area of the Cannaregio sestiere of Venice, divided into the Ghetto Nuovo ("New Ghetto"), and the adjacent Ghetto Vecchio ("Old Ghetto"). These names of the ghetto sections are misleading, as they refer to an older and newer site at the time of their use by the foundries: in terms of Jewish residence, the Ghetto Nuovo is actually older than the Ghetto Vecchio.
The ghetto was connected to the rest of the city by two bridges that were only open during the day. Gates were opened in the morning at the ringing of the marangona, the largest bell in St. Mark's "Campanile" (belfry), and locked in the evening. Permanent, round-the-clock surveillance of the gates occurred at the Jewish residents' expense. Strict penalties were to be imposed on any Jewish resident caught outside after curfew. Areas of Ghetto Nuovo that were open to the canal were to be sealed off with walls, while outward facing quays were to be bricked over in order to make it impossible for unauthorized entry or exit. The area that was considered to be Ghetto Vecchio later on, was once an area where Christians lived and once the Christians relocated, the area became available for non-Venetian Jewish merchants to stay while working in the city temporarily.

Culture

Though it was home to a large number of Jews, the population living in the Venetian Ghetto never assimilated to form a distinct, "Venetian Jewish" ethnicity. Four of the five synagogues were clearly divided according to ethnic identity: separate synagogues existed for the German (the Scuola Grande Tedesca), Italian (the Scuola Italiana), Spanish and Portuguese (the Scuola Spagnola), and Levantine Sephardi communities (the Scuola Levantina). The fifth, the Scuola Canton, was possibly built as a private synagogue and also served the Venetian Ashkenazi community. Today, there are also other populations of Ashkenazic Jews in Venice, mainly Lubavitchers who operate a kosher food store, a yeshiva, and a Chabad synagogue.

Languages historically spoken in the confines of the Ghetto include Venetian, Italian, Judeo-Spanish, French, and German. In addition, Hebrew was traditionally (and still is) used on signage, inscriptions, and for official purposes such as wedding contracts (as well as, of course, in religious services). Today, English is widely used in the shops and the Museum because of the large number of English-speaking tourists.

A large portion of the culture of the Venetian Ghetto was the struggle that existed for Jews to travel outside of the ghetto, especially for employment purposes. Life in the Venetian Ghetto was very restricted, and movement of Jews outside of the ghetto was difficult. Inspired by lives of Jewish merchants outside of Venice, Rodriga, a prominent Jewish Spanish merchant, took on the role of advocating for Venetian Jews to have rights similar to others in different locations. Rodriga sited that Jews played a part in the Italian economy which could not be ignored. In return for the changing of Jewish restrictions, Rodriga promised that the Ventian economy and commerce would increase.

Ghetto today

Today, the Ghetto is still a center of Jewish life in the city. The Jewish community of Venice, that counts about 450 people, is culturally active, although only a few members live in the Ghetto because the area has become expensive.

Every year, there is an international conference on Hebrew Studies, with particular reference to the history and culture of the Veneto. Other conferences, exhibitions and seminars are held throughout the course of the year.

The temples not only serve as places of worship but also provide lessons on the sacred texts and the Talmud for both children and adults, along with courses in Modern Hebrew, while other social facilities include a kindergarten, an old people's home, the kosher guest house Giardino dei Melograni, the kosher restaurant Hostaria del Ghetto, and a bakery. Along with its architectural and artistic monuments, the community also boasts a Museum of Jewish Art, the Renato Maestro Library and Archive and the new Info Point inside the Midrash Leon da Modena.

In the Ghetto area there is also a yeshiva, several Judaica shops, and a Chabad synagogue run by Chabad of Venice. Although only few of the roughly 500 Venetian Jews still live in the Ghetto, many return there during the day for religious services in the two synagogues which are still used for worship (the other three are only used for guided tours, offered by the Jewish Community Museum).

Chabad of Venice also runs a pastry shop and a restaurant named "Gam Gam" in the Ghetto. Sabbath meals are served at the restaurant's outdoor tables along the Cannaregio Canal with views of the Guglie Bridge near the Grand Canal. In the novel Much Ado About Jesse Kaplan the restaurant is the site of a historical mystery. Every year for the festival of Sukkot a sukkah is built on a canal boat that tours the city, a large menorah tours the city on a canal boat during Hanukkah.

Notable residents
Notable residents of the Ghetto have included Leon of Modena, whose family originated in France, as well as his disciple Sara Copia Sullam. She was an accomplished writer, debater (through letters), and even hosted her own salon. Meir Magino, the famous glassmaker also came from the ghetto.

In fiction
 Amitav Ghosh 2019 novel Gun Island links the Sundarbans to Venice and the Ghetto.
 Geraldine Brooks' 2008 novel People of the Book which traces the history of the Sarajevo Haggadah has a chapter with action taking place in 1609 in the Venetian Ghetto.
 Sarah Dunant's novel In the Company of the Courtesan, written in 2006, has some scenes which take place in a Jewish pawnshop in the Ghetto
 Susanna Clarke's 2004 novel Jonathan Strange & Mr Norrell features a scene in the Ghetto.
 Hugo Pratt's Fable of Venice. Corto Maltese, Book 8. Graphic Novel. IDW Publishing. 
 Rainer Maria Rilke: Eine Szene aus dem Ghetto. in: Rilke: Geschichten von lieben Gott. Insel, Leipzig 1931, Argon, Berlin 2006.  (div. weitere Ausg.)  
 William Shakespeare's Shylock in The Merchant of Venice, including in adaptations and related work such as Arnold Wesker's play The Merchant (1978) and Mirjam Pressler's novel Shylocks Tochter.
The trilogy by Israel Zangwill:
 Kinder des Ghetto. 1897. Cronbach, Berlin 1897, 1913 (German)
 Träumer des Ghetto. 1898. Cronbach, Berlin 1908, 1922 (German)
 Komödien des Ghetto. 1907. Cronbach, Berlin 1910 (German)
 Daniel Silva:  A Death in Vienna. 2004. Novel (features scenes in Cannaregio). 
 Noah Gordon: The Jerusalem Diamond (1979) includes several chapters based in the ghetto of the 1500s.

See also
Moses Soave
History of the Jews in Venice
Fondaco dei Turchi
Fondaco dei Tedeschi

References

Notes

Bibliography
Ariel Toaff, "Getto - Ghetto," The American Sephardi 6:1/2 (1973): 71-77.
Sandra Debenedetti-Stow, "The etymology of “ghetto”: new evidence from Rome", Jewish History, Volume 6, Issue 1 - 2, Mar 1992, Pages 79 – 85, DOI 10.1007/BF01695211
DIETRO LE PAROLE - GLOBALIZZAZIONE di Francesco Varanini
Europe The Venice Ghetto on europeforvisitors.com
 Alice Becker-Ho, Le premier ghetto ou l'exemplarité vénitienne, 2014
 Alice Becker-Ho, The First Ghetto or Venetian Exemplariness, 2016 (unpublished)

External links

 Official website of the Jewish Community of Venice
 Official website of the kashrut in Venice
 Official website of Chabad in the Jewish Community of Venice
 the oldest Kosher restaurant Gam Gam in Venice
 Info Point of the Jewish Community of Venice
 Web site of the Jewish Ghetto of Venice
 Jewish Library-Archive "Renato Maestro"
 Ghetto map and history
 Wiki: University of California Santa Cruz, Jewish Writers and the Modern European City: Venice
 Map of the Ghetto drawing by Gianluca Costantini
 Documentary Venice and the Ghetto (2017)

.
Geography of Venice
Italian Jewish communities
Jewish ghettos in Europe
Jewish Italian history
Antisemitism in Italy
History of Venice after 1797
Republic of Venice
1516 establishments in the Republic of Venice